I Survived: Hindi Sumusuko Ang Pinoy (English: I Survived: Filipinos Don't Give Up) is a reality drama program aired by ABS-CBN from March 19, 2009, to December 2, 2010. The show was presented by Ces Drilon.

Awards and nominations
Nominated - Best Documentary Program - 23rd PMPC Star Awards for Television
Nominated - Ces Oreña-Drilon - Best Documentary Program Host - 23rd PMPC Star Awards for Television
Nominated - Best Current Affairs Programme - 14th Asian Television Awards

References

ABS-CBN News and Current Affairs shows
ABS-CBN original programming
Philippine documentary television series
2009 Philippine television series debuts
2010 Philippine television series endings
Filipino-language television shows